The Spraker Service Station, at 240 S. Wilson St. in Vinita, Oklahoma, United States, is a Tudor Revival-style Conoco filling station which was built in 1927.  It was listed on the National Register of Historic Places in 1995.

It is a one-story brick building, built on U.S. Route 66.

See also 
 Continental Oil Company Building: NRHP-listed Conoco bulk storage complex in Cheyenne, Wyoming
 Continental Oil Company Filling Station: NRHP-listed Conoco gas station in Kalispell, Montana
 Jackson Conoco Service Station: NRHP-listed Conoco gas station in El Reno, Oklahoma
 Hughes Conoco Service Station: NRHP-listed Conoco gas station in Topeka, Kansas
 Huning Highlands Conoco Service Station: NRHP-listed Conoco gas station in Albuquerque, New Mexico
 Rainbow Conoco: NRHP-listed Conoco gas station in Shelby, Montana

References

Gas stations on the National Register of Historic Places in Oklahoma
National Register of Historic Places in Craig County, Oklahoma
Tudor Revival architecture in Oklahoma
Buildings and structures completed in 1927
1927 establishments in Oklahoma
ConocoPhillips